Nationality words link to articles with information on the nation's poetry or literature (for instance, Irish or France).

Events

Works published

Births
Death years link to the corresponding "[year] in poetry" article. There are conflicting or unreliable sources for the birth years of many people born in this period; where sources conflict, the poet is listed again and the conflict is noted:

840:
 Saint Clement of Ohrid (died 916), Bulgarian writer and founder of the Ohrid Literary School

845:
 Sugawara no Michizane (died 903), Japanese kanshi poet

849:
 Alfred the Great (died 899)

Deaths
Birth years link to the corresponding "[year] in poetry" article:

842:
 Liu Yuxi (born 772), Chinese poet

843:
 Jia Dao (born 779), Chinese poet of discursive gushi and lyric jintishi

845:
 Abu Tammam (born 805), Arab poet and Muslim convert

846:
 Bai Juyi (also transliterated as Po Chü-I), (born 772), Chinese poet of the Tang dynasty

849:
 August 18: Walafrid Strabo (born 808), Frankish monk, historian, poet and theological writer

See also

 Poetry
 9th century in poetry
 9th century in literature
 List of years in poetry

Other events:
 Other events of the 12th century
 Other events of the 13th century

9th century:
 9th century in poetry
 9th century in literature

Notes

Poetry by year
Poetry